Rick Leach and Jim Pugh were the defending champions.

Leach and Pugh successfully defended their title, defeating Udo Riglewski and Michael Stich 6–4, 6–4 in the final.

Seeds
All seeds receive a bye into the second round.

Draw

Finals

Top half

Bottom half

External links
 Draw

U.S. Pro Indoor
1991 ATP Tour